Claim jumping may refer to: 
Claim jumping (gold rush)
Squatting